This is a list of buildings which have been listed as protected properties of UNESCO's World Heritage site within Historic Bridgetown, Barbados and its Garrison.

List of buildings

Note
UP IN ARMS

References

Further reading
Map of historic and buffer zones
Listed Buildings within Historic Bridgetown & its Garrison, Town and Country Planning Dept.
List of buildings
Things That Matter: A magnificent seven – Derelict treasures, 5/27/2012

External links
Town & Country Development Planning Office
Barbados Town and Country Planning Society

Historic
Buildings and structures in Bridgetown